Phyllonorycter distentella is a moth of the family Gracillariidae. It is known from Germany to Portugal, Italy and Hungary and from Great Britain to southern Russia.

The wingspan is 8–9 mm. There are two generations per year with adults on wing in May and again in August.

The larvae feed on Quercus pubescens and Quercus robur. They mine the leaves of their host plant. They create a lower-surface tentiform mine. The lower epidermis has numerous extremely fine folds. The mine is exceptionally large and extends from the midrib to the leaf margin. The roof of the mine is largely eaten out but generally a green centre is left. There are often several mines in a single leaf. The mine causes the leaf to contract strongly. The pupa is suspended in the mine by a loose net of silk. The frass is deposited in a corner of the mine.

References

distentella
Moths of Europe
Moths described in 1846